John Lace may refer to:
 John Dale Lace, South African gold and diamond mining magnate
 John Henry Lace, British botanist